In statistics and natural language processing, a topic model is a type of statistical model for discovering the abstract "topics" that occur in a collection of documents. Topic modeling is a frequently used text-mining tool for discovery of hidden semantic structures in a text body. Intuitively, given that a document is about a particular topic, one would expect particular words to appear in the document more or less frequently: "dog" and "bone" will appear more often in documents about dogs, "cat" and "meow" will appear in documents about cats, and "the" and "is" will appear approximately equally in both. A document typically concerns multiple topics in different proportions; thus, in a document that is 10% about cats and 90% about dogs, there would probably be about 9 times more dog words than cat words. The "topics" produced by topic modeling techniques are clusters of similar words. A topic model captures this intuition in a mathematical framework, which allows examining a set of documents and discovering, based on the statistics of the words in each, what the topics might be and what each document's balance of topics is.

Topic models are also referred to as probabilistic topic models, which refers to statistical algorithms for discovering the latent semantic structures of an extensive text body. In the age of information, the amount of the written material we encounter each day is simply beyond our processing capacity. Topic models can help to organize and offer insights for us to understand large collections of unstructured text bodies. Originally developed as a text-mining tool, topic models have been used to detect instructive structures in data such as genetic information, images, and networks. They also have applications in other fields such as bioinformatics and computer vision.

History
An early topic model was described by Papadimitriou, Raghavan, Tamaki and Vempala in 1998. Another one, called probabilistic latent semantic analysis (PLSA), was created by Thomas Hofmann in 1999. Latent Dirichlet allocation (LDA), perhaps the most common topic model currently in use, is a generalization of PLSA. Developed by David Blei, Andrew Ng, and Michael I. Jordan in 2002, LDA introduces sparse Dirichlet prior distributions over document-topic and topic-word distributions, encoding the intuition that documents cover a small number of topics and that topics often use a small number of words. Other topic models are generally extensions on LDA, such as Pachinko allocation, which improves on LDA by modeling correlations between topics in addition to the word correlations which constitute topics. Hierarchical latent tree analysis (HLTA) is an alternative to LDA, which models word co-occurrence using a tree of latent variables and the states of the latent variables, which correspond to soft clusters of documents, are interpreted as topics.

Topic models for context information

Approaches for temporal information include Block and Newman's determination of the temporal dynamics of topics in the Pennsylvania Gazette during 1728–1800. Griffiths & Steyvers used topic modeling on abstracts from the journal PNAS to identify topics that rose or fell in popularity from 1991 to 2001 whereas Lamba & Madhusushan  used topic modeling on full-text research articles retrieved from DJLIT journal from 1981–2018. In the field of library and information science, Lamba & Madhusudhan  applied topic modeling on different Indian resources like journal articles and electronic theses and resources (ETDs). Nelson  has been analyzing change in topics over time in the Richmond Times-Dispatch to understand social and political changes and continuities in Richmond during the American Civil War. Yang, Torget and Mihalcea applied topic modeling methods to newspapers from 1829–2008. Mimno used topic modelling with 24 journals on classical philology and archaeology spanning 150 years to look at how topics in the journals change over time and how the journals become more different or similar over time.

Yin et al. introduced a topic model for geographically distributed documents, where document positions are explained by latent regions which are detected during inference.

Chang and Blei included network information between linked documents in the relational topic model, to model the links between websites.

The author-topic model by Rosen-Zvi et al. models the topics associated with authors of documents to improve the topic detection for documents with authorship information.

HLTA was applied to a collection of recent research papers published at major AI and Machine Learning venues. The resulting model is called The AI Tree. The resulting topics are used to index the papers at aipano.cse.ust.hk to help researchers track research trends and identify papers to read, and help conference organizers and journal editors identify reviewers for submissions.

To improve the qualitative aspects and coherency of generated topics, some researchers have explored the efficacy of "coherence scores", or otherwise how computer-extracted clusters (i.e. topics) align with a human benchmark. Coherence scores are metrics for optimising the number of topics to extract from a document corpus.

Algorithms
In practice, researchers attempt to fit appropriate model parameters to the data corpus using one of several heuristics for maximum likelihood fit. A recent survey by Blei describes this suite of algorithms.
Several groups of researchers starting with Papadimitriou et al. have attempted to design algorithms with probable guarantees. Assuming that the data were actually generated by the model in question, they try to design algorithms that probably find the model that was used to create the data. Techniques used here include singular value decomposition (SVD) and the method of moments. In 2012 an algorithm based upon non-negative matrix factorization (NMF) was introduced that also generalizes to topic models with correlations among topics.

In 2018 a new approach to topic models was proposed: it is based on stochastic block model

Topic models for quantitative biomedicine 
Topic models are being used also in other contexts. For examples uses of topic models in biology and bioinformatics research emerged. Recently topic models has been used to extract information from dataset of cancers' genomic samples.
In this case topics are biological latent variables to be inferred.

See also 
 Explicit semantic analysis
 Latent semantic analysis
 Latent Dirichlet allocation
 Hierarchical Dirichlet process
 Non-negative matrix factorization
 Statistical classification
 Unsupervised learning
 Mallet (software project)
 Gensim

References

Further reading

Jockers, M. 2010 Who's your DH Blog Mate: Match-Making the Day of DH Bloggers with Topic Modeling Matthew L. Jockers, posted 19 March 2010
Drouin, J. 2011 Foray Into Topic Modeling Ecclesiastical Proust Archive. posted 17 March 2011
Templeton, C. 2011 Topic Modeling in the Humanities: An Overview Maryland Institute for Technology in the Humanities Blog. posted 1 August 2011

Yang, T., A Torget and R. Mihalcea (2011) Topic Modeling on Historical Newspapers. Proceedings of the 5th ACL-HLT Workshop on Language Technology for Cultural Heritage, Social Sciences, and Humanities. The Association for Computational Linguistics, Madison, WI. pages 96–104.

External links

Topic Models Applied to Online News and Reviews Video of a Google Tech Talk presentation by Alice Oh on topic modeling with LDA
Modeling Science: Dynamic Topic Models of Scholarly Research Video of a Google Tech Talk presentation by David M. Blei
Automated Topic Models in Political Science Video of a presentation by Brandon Stewart at the Tools for Text Workshop, 14 June 2010
Shawn Graham, Ian Milligan, and Scott Weingart 
Blei, David M. "Introductory material and software"
 code, demo - example of using LDA for topic modelling

Statistical natural language processing
Latent variable models
Corpus linguistics